Timberland High School is the second largest of the four high schools in the Wentzville R-IV School District and fourth largest high school in St. Charles County, Missouri. The school was established as an annex in 2000 and as an independent high school in 2002. The 2020-21 enrollment was 1,845.

History
The facility now known as Timberland High School opened on August 28, 2000 as an annex to Wentzville Holt High School for approximately 400 freshmen and sophomores within the boundaries covering the southern portion of the school district. In May 2001, the board of education voted to name the new high school Timberland High School, a name which had been submitted by sophomore Jaci Woodburn. Timberland became a fully independent four-year high school in 2002.

Academics
48% of the class of 2014 graduates went on to attend a four-year college. 35.5% entered a two-year college, while 8% entered the workforce or military service.

In 2014, the average composite ACT score for Timberland was 22.9, which was above the state average of 21.8 and national average of 21.0

Timberland High School received A+ designation on May 23, 2002. The A+ Schools program is a school improvement initiative established by the Outstanding Schools Act of 1993. Graduates who meet the seven A+ state requirements are eligible for tuition reimbursement and general fee reimbursement to attend any public community college or vocational/technical school in the State of Missouri.

Athletics
Scott Swofford Stadium was dedicated in October 2002. Swofford was a long time head football coach at Wentzville Holt High School from 1986–1998. He spent the last two years of his coaching career as an assistant the running backs and special teams coach for the Washington University Bears. During his first year at Washington University, the team earned its only NCAA playoff appearance in its history. Swofford died suddenly of a heart attack in September 2002. His wife, Runa Swofford, worked at Timberland and years ago purchased a bell in her husband's name. The tradition of ringing that bell after football victories continues today. There is also a seniors vs. faculty basketball game dedicated to Scott. All three high schools in the district have their own Swofford games.

Notable alumni
 Montee Ball '09, former NFL running back for the Denver Broncos and New England Patriots

References

External links

High schools in St. Charles County, Missouri
Educational institutions established in 2002
Public high schools in Missouri
2002 establishments in Missouri